Libido is a 1965 Italian giallo film written and directed by Ernesto Gastaldi and Vittorio Salerno, from a story by Gastaldi's wife Mara Maryl. It stars Giancarlo Giannini, Luciano Pigozzi, Maryl and Dominique Boschero.

Plot
In a cliffside mansion, a young boy named Christian witnesses his sex maniac father murder his mistress in a room lined with mirrors. The father then kills himself by jumping off the cliff. Years later, the now adult Christian returns to inherit the family home with his fiancee Helene, his attorney Paul and Paul's wife Brigitte. Christian fears that his father may still be alive, and that he may inherit his father's insanity along with his house. The room of mirrors continues to haunt Christian in adulthood, reflecting and amplifying his own sexual obsessions. Strange events occur that lead Christian to believe his father may still be actually living in the house.

Cast
 Giancarlo Giannini (as John Charlie Johns) as Christian Coreau
 Mara Maryl as Brigitte Benoit
 Dominique Boschero as Helene Coreau
 Luciano Pigozzi (as Alan Collins) as Paul Benoit

Production
According to Gastaldi, Libido was filmed in only 18 days on a bet. He based the screenplay on a story idea conceived by his wife Mara Maryl, who also had a co-starring role in the film. Gastaldi reused some footage from this film in his later 1982 horror film Notturno con grida.

The film's plot borrowed from both Les Diaboliques and Roger Corman's The Pit and the Pendulum, according to critic Adrian Luther Smith, who continued: "Despite the inevitable constraints of the budget, "Libido" looks refreshingly sharp due to impressive B&W photography (by Romolo Garroni) and some great locations."

References

1960s Italian-language films